Somdet Phra Samphanthawong Thoe Chaofa Krommaluang Thep-harirak (1759–1805), birth name Tan, was a prince of Siam. He was a nephew of King Rama I. He was known in Vietnamese contexts as Chiêu Tăng (昭曾).

Prince Thepharirak was the eldest son of Princess Sri Sudarak (เจ้าฟ้ากรมพระศรีสุดารักษ์) (sister of Phutthayotfa Chulalok) and her Chinese husband Ngoen Saetan. One of his sisters was Sri Suriyendra.

In 1783, Nguyễn Ánh, who was the Nguyễn lord ruled over southern Vietnam, sought aid for Siamese to retake Gia Định (Saigon) from Tây-Sơn rebel forces. In 1785, Prince Thepharirak was ordered to attack Saigon with 50,000 soldiers together with Ánh, while Phraya Wichitnarong led an army through Cambodia in order to gather khmer soldiers to join the battalion. Chaophraya Aphaiphubet (Vietnamese: Chiêu Thùy Biện 昭錘卞), the governor of Cambodia, also sent 5000 Cambodian soldiers to support them. They were utterly beaten by Nguyễn Huệ in Rạch Gầm-Xoài Mút, and fled to Cambodia. King Rama I was furious. The King was about to punish him, but then the two elder sisters of the King gave a royal pardon.

Krommaluang Thepharirak was authorized to attack Chiang Saen together with Phraya Yommarat in 1804.

He is the progenitor of the Devahastin family, a cadet branch of Chakri Dynasty that descended directly from the siblings of King Rama I.

References

Thai people of Chinese descent
18th-century Chakri dynasty
19th-century Chakri dynasty
1759 births
1805 deaths
Thai male Chao Fa
Devahastin family